John Sobieslaw of Moravia (1352 – c. 30 October 1380) was a Czech feudal lord, junior margrave of Moravia. John was the second son of John Henry, Margrave of Moravia and Margaret of Opava. In historiography, he was mistaken for his illegitimate half-brother patriarch of Aquileia , for a long time.

Ancestors

References

1352 births
1380 deaths
House of Luxembourg